Weingeister (English: Wine Spirits) is the eighth and final release of Einstürzende Neubauten's Musterhaus project, a series of highly experimental CD releases that were only available via an annual subscription through their website or from shows during their 25th Anniversary Tour. This project was separate from their Neubauten.org Supporter Project, which it ran concurrent to.

The central theme of this last Musterhaus release is recordings of the band members drinking and enjoying different kinds of wine. As quoted from the back of the album:

 "It started out as just an idea, perhaps out of a simple wish to drink some wine with friends as a performance, not talking, just ritualised behavior (symposium in the original sense?), concentrating on just the wine and on the sound. Everything was miked, the table, the glasses, the throats - and we really didn't know where this was taking us. Yes, the wines were good."

Track listing
 "2004 Carriddi Bianco / Colosi, Sicilia" – 5:00
 "2004 Moscato Giallo / Manincor, Alto Adige" – 7:02
 "1997 Cuvée Annamaria Clementi / Ca' Del Bosco, Lombardia" – 4:28
 "2003 Rossi Di Bisaccia / Cossentino, Sicilia" – 6:49
 "1995 Brunello Riserva / Col D'Orcia, Toscana" – 3:27
 "1997 Condrieu Les Chaillets / Cuilleron, Rhone" – 3:46

Notes
Included on the disc is a 40-minute-long QuickTime movie documenting the event

Weingeister was conceived by Blixa Bargeld, performed and composed by Einstürzende Neubauten on May, 21st 2006 in "The Bunker" in Berlin
Live recordings by Boris Wilsdorf
Additional recordings, mixing and editing by Marco Paschke
Video editing by Ian Williamson

External links 
Musterhaus Project website

Einstürzende Neubauten albums
2007 albums